The Adelaide Times was an early newspaper founded by James Allen and printed in Adelaide, the capital of the then colony of South Australia. It was published between 2 October 1848 and 8 May 1858, and evolved through a series of names and publication frequencies, and closed due to uncertainty surrounding Allen's bankruptcy.

History 
The Adelaide Times was established by Allen, an experienced newspaper man, in partnership with John Brown and William Barlow Gilbert. Allen, who had just visited England in 1845-1848, had previously worked on other local newspapers, the Southern Australian and South Australian Register, and periodicals such as South Australian Magazine and Monthly Almanac and Illustrated Commentator.

The newspaper's original format and masthead were copied from The Times of London. It was published weekly from October 1848; semiweekly from October 1849; three times a week from March 1850; and, daily from April 1850. As was common for the time, it evolved through various titles, such as The Adelaide Times and General Commercial Advertiser (15 January 1849 – 10 September 1849) and The Times (6 March 1850 – 16 November 1853).

In November 1853 Allen sold the newspaper to a consortium, including Richard Hanson, Robert Torrens, George Stevenson, John Brown, and Edward Gwynne. W. M. Akhurst, who was reporter and sub-editor, resigned rather than work under the new owners. The Adelaide Times was later sold to Allen's former partner, Gilbert, but in 1855 Gilbert went bankrupt and the newspaper was re-purchased by Allen, who himself went bankrupt in early 1858. Shortly afterwards, Rev. John Henry Barrow, a former editor of the South Australian Register founded the morning newspaper The South Australian Advertiser and a companion weekly The South Australian Weekly Chronicle.

Gilbert, who was a nephew of Thomas Gilbert, later moved to Victoria, where he worked for The Argus and became a reporter for the Victorian Hansard. Gilbert next returned to Adelaide, where he held various Government positions. He died on 13 March 1893.

References

External links 

1848 establishments in Australia
Defunct newspapers published in Adelaide
Newspapers on Trove